Jean-Jacques Crenca (born 3 April 1969) is a French rugby player.

Crenca was born in Marmande, Aquitaine. He played for SU Agen before moving to RC Toulon for the 2006/07 season. He was a member of France's 2003 Rugby World Cup squad playing at prop.

External links
 RWC 2003 bio
 ERC rugby bio

1969 births
Living people
People from Marmande
French rugby union players
Rugby union props
France international rugby union players
RC Toulonnais players
Sportspeople from Lot-et-Garonne